The Aruba Davis Cup team represents Aruba in Davis Cup tennis competition and are governed by the Aruba Lawn Tennis Bond. They currently compete in the Americas Zone of Group IV.

History
Aruba competed in its first Davis Cup in 2007.

Players

Other player called:
 Noah Muyale (2022)

Recent performances
Here is the list of all match-ups of Aruba participation in the Davis Cup in 2022.

See also
Davis Cup

Notes

References

External links

Davis Cup teams
Davis Cup
Davis Cup